Catherine Lyons (born 30 August 2000) is a former British artistic gymnast. She has represented Great Britain numerous times in a prodigious junior career, most notably at the 2014 European Championships where she was crowned Junior European Floor Champion as well as taking home a silver with the team. Lyons retired from the sport in 2018, aged 17.

In 2020 Lyons, with fellow gymnast Lisa Mason went public with allegations of serious physical and mental abuse within the British Gymnastics system In response several elite and former elite gymnasts came forward, corroborating Lyons and Mason's allegations in their own careers, including European champions Becky Downie and Ellie Downie and Olympic medallist Amy Tinkler. Later that year, British Gymnastics CEO Jane Allen resigned from her role, although denied her resignation was linked to the Lyons and Mason interviews and their fallout.

Junior career

2014
At the 2014 British Championships, Lyons took home all-around bronze as well as Floor gold and Beam silver. In May, Lyons competed at the 2014 European Women's Artistic Gymnastics Championships in Sofia, Bulgaria winning a silver with the team and a gold on the Floor.

2015
In March, Lyons competed at the English Championships in Loughborough. In the all-around competition she scored 14.450 on the vault, 12.200 on the uneven bars, 14.550 on the balance beam and 13.500 on the floor exercise finishing with a score of 54.700. Lyons' balance beam was over half a point higher than any senior gymnast in the English gymnast, the highest senior balance beam score was 13.900 posted by Olympic medallist Amy Tinkler, Lyons' all-around total would have been enough for the bronze medal if she were a senior.

Later in March, Lyons competed at the British Championships in Liverpool. Lyons had a solid performance in the all-around competition scoring 14.100 on the vault, 13.200 on the uneven bars, 14.100 on the balance beam and 14.200 on the floor exercise for a total score of 55.600 winning gold and 2.800 points better than the second place gymnast. Lyons medalled in every event final, winning gold in the vault final with an average score of 13.675, a silver in the uneven bars final with 13.600, another gold in the balance beam final after a positive routine and a solid score of 14.700 and another final gold medal in the floor exercise with 14.350 to finish off a positive meet at the championships.

2018

After struggles with injury during transition to the senior ranks, Lyons confirmed her retirement from the sport.

Personal life 
Lyons was born on 30 August 2000; making the age requirement for her school year by just two days. She attended St.Anthony's RC Primary School.
She attended Kingsdale Foundation School, taking her GCSE exams in 2016.

Competitive Highlights

References 

2000 births
Living people
British female artistic gymnasts
Junior artistic gymnasts
People from Dulwich